The gunjac (plural: gunjci) or bajs is a violoncello-like Croatian instrument but with only two strings. Gunjac instrumentalists are called bajsisti. It is a double bass string instrument played with a bow.

The gunjac is commonly found in melodic groupings (tunes) associated with North-Western and Central Croatia including the regions of Zagreb, Žumberak, Pokuplje, Upper Posavina, Moslavina, and Bilogora.

An international festival of bajs players is held annually in Draguć, Istria.

References

External links
Prof. Dr. Darko Zubrinic, 09/1/2007. "Istarski gunjci, musicological book by Vladimir Pernić" [Istrian gunjci], Croatia.org
Darko Zubrinic, Zagreb (1995). "Croatian Pop and Folk Music", CroatianHistory.net
Stanislav Tuksar and Grozdana Marošević. "Croatia." Grove Music Online. Oxford Music Online. 27 Sep. 2011 

Bowed instruments
Croatian musical instruments
String instruments